Objection! is a 1992 video game published by TransMedia Productions, Inc.

Gameplay
Objection! is a game which is aimed at improving the evidentiary law capabilities for a practicing trial lawyer.

Development
Objection! was programmed by Ashley Lipson, Professor of Law.

Reception
Jasper Sylvester reviewed the game for Computer Gaming World, and stated that "we find the program suitable for those who want a challenge that is cerebral, realistic and intense. Case dismissed."

Aurora Dizon for PC World said "Objection! a game you don't play to win, but win by playing."

References

External links
Computer Simulation in Legal Education from International Journal of Law and Information Technology

1992 video games
Criminal law video games
DOS games
DOS-only games
Simulation video games
Video games developed in the United States
Video games set in Los Angeles